Agrae or Agrai was an inland town of ancient Pisidia inhabited during Byzantine times. 

Its site is located near Ağras, in Atabey, Isparta Province, Turkey.

References

Populated places in Pisidia
Former populated places in Turkey
Populated places of the Byzantine Empire
History of Isparta Province